Town Centre may refer to:
 A town centre 
 Town Centre (KCRC), station on MTR Light Rail, in Tuen Mun, New Territories, Hong Kong
Town Centre (ward)

See also 
 Town Center (disambiguation)